Amaraji  is a city located in the state of Pernambuco, Brazil. It has an estimated (IBGE 2020) population of 22,870 inhabitants.

Geography
 State - Pernambuco
 Region - Zona da mata Pernambucana
 Boundaries - Chã Grande (N); Ribeirão (S); Primavera (E); Gravatá and Cortês (W)
 Area - 234.78 km2
 Elevation - 289m
 Hydrography - Sirinhaém and Ipojuca rivers
 Vegetation - Subcaducifólia forest
 Climate - Hot tropical and humid
 Annual average temperature - 24.0 c
 Distance to Recife - 101.6 km

Economy
The main economic activities in Amaraji are based in food & beverage industry and agribusiness, especially sugarcane, bananas, manioc; and livestock such as cattle and poultry.

Economic indicators

Economy by Sector
2006

Health indicators

References

Municipalities in Pernambuco